Apelles of Heraklion is numbered among the Seventy Disciples. St. Apelles was bishop of Heraclea in Trachis. His feast day is October 31.

Sources 
St. Nikolai Velimirovic, The Prologue from Ohrid

External links
Apostle Narcissus of the Seventy, January 4 (OCA)
Apostle Narcissus of the Seventy, October 31 (OCA)

References

Seventy disciples
1st-century bishops in Roman Achaea
1st-century deaths
Year of birth unknown